Justice Wilson may refer to:

United States Supreme Court
 James Wilson (Founding Father) (1742–1798), associate justice of the United States Supreme Court

U.S. state supreme courts
 Alma Wilson (1917–1999), associate justice and chief justice of the Oklahoma Supreme Court
 Donald R. Wilson (1917–1983), associate justice of the Supreme Court of Appeals of West Virginia
 Edward H. C. Wilson (1820–1870), associate justice of the Michigan Supreme Court
 Francis S. Wilson (1872–1951), associate justice of the Supreme Court of Illinois
 Joseph G. Wilson (1826–1873), associate justice of the Oregon Supreme Court
 Kenneth B. Wilson (born 1938), associate justice of the New Mexico Supreme Court
 Michael D. Wilson (fl. 2010s–2020s), associate justice of the Supreme Court of Hawaii
 Paul C. Wilson (born 1961), judge of the Supreme Court of Missouri
 Samuel B. Wilson (1873–1954), chief justice of the Minnesota Supreme Court
 Scott Wilson (judge) (1870–1942), chief justice of the Maine Supreme Judicial Court
 Thomas Stokeley Wilson (1813–1894), judge of the Iowa Territorial Supreme Court
 Thomas Wilson (Minnesota politician) (1827–1910), associate justice of the Minnesota Supreme Court
 Will Wilson (Texas politician) (1912–2005), associate justice of the Texas Supreme Court
 William C. Wilson (judge) (1812–1882), associate justice of the Vermont Supreme Court
 William Roscoe Wilson Curl (died 1782), associate justice of the first Virginia Court of Appeals (now the Supreme Court of Virginia)
 William Wilson (Illinois jurist) (1794–1857), associate justice of the Supreme Court of Illinois

Courts of other countries
 Nicholas Wilson, Lord Wilson of Culworth (born 1945), justice of the Supreme Court of the United Kingdom
 Bertha Wilson (1923–2007), puisne justice of the Supreme Court of Canada
 Ronald Wilson (1922–2005), justice of the High Court of Australia

See also
Wilson (name)
Judge Wilson (disambiguation)